Macrauzata melanapex is a moth in the family Drepanidae. It was described by Inoue in 1993. It is found on Borneo, Sumatra and Peninsular Malaysia.

References

Moths described in 1993
Drepaninae